Cairo Metro Line 1 is the first line of the Cairo Metro in Cairo, Egypt. It is the first metro system in the Africa and the Middle East. It was constructed in 1987 and connects Helwan with El Marg, stopping at 35 stations. The line can carry 60,000 passengers per hour in each direction.

Costs

The Construction of the project started in 1982 after the French government agreed on giving Egypt the necessary loan. The first Helwan - El Marg line costs 1107 million Francs which were converted into Egyptian currency and divided into multiple stages. The total cost of the first stage from Helwan to Ramsis is  divided into the following:
 for the movement of 60 km different structures and the improvement of the older railways.
 for the creation of a station in Dar El Salam.
The second stage coasted in total  and connected the (Laymoun Bridge-Marg) railway with the metro. Additional costs were made available as requested by the ministry of transportation:
 for completing the (Ramsis-Marg) lane.
 for the third stage of the (Helwan-Marg) lane.
 for the (Shubra el Kheima-Ramsis-El Tahrir) lane
 for the preparation study of the second lane Imbaba-El Darasa

Construction
The construction of the Helwan-El Marg line was in two stages.
The first stage was from Helwan to Sayeda Zenab and included a tunnel from Helwan to Ramsis square.
The isolation of the existing railways and the construction of 9 car bridges and 21 people bridges.
The construction of 17 rail lane switcher.
The renovation of the existing railways.
It includes five subterranean stations after the Sayeda Zenab station:
Saad Zaghloul station
Sadat station
Gamal Abdel Nasser station
Ahmed Orabi station
 Mubarak (now: Al-Shohadaa) station under Ramsis square
The Construction of this line consumed the following resources:
 of concrete works.
 of digging works.
3900 concrete walls
 other digging works.
In 1987 the line from Helwan to Ramsis square was finished and opened for the public.

The operation of the line was aimed for 1988, but due to some difficulties it started operation in 1989.
The second stage included also:
The conversion of the Marg line to an electric line.
The acquisition of 48 new units, which would make 100 units available for operation.
The improvement of a workstation to provide maintenance works for 204 Units.
The construction of a 220 kilo-Volt power generator, to provide electricity for the future lines.

Connections

To other Metro lines
Line 1 connects to Line 2 at Shohadaa and Sadat Stations. It is expected to connect with Line 3 in October 2015 at Nasser Station when Phase 3 of Line 3 is completed.

To other forms of transit
Shohadaa Station is immediately next to Ramses Station, providing access to Egyptian National Railways long-haul and short-haul domestic passenger service. Cairo Transport Authority buses and private microbus services are also nearby.

Access to Cairo International Airport is expected via transfer to Line 3 upon completion of Phase 4 in early 2020.

Driving Simulator
A new train driving simulator integrated in Cairo Metro's training center dedicated for Line 1 drivers, which was provided by Transurb Technirail that won the international tender issued by Cairo Metro in December 2011.

Transurb Technirail will provide Cairo Metro with a driving simulator and a computer-assisted learning area to train Line 1 drivers, improving their driving skills and to train them on the elementary functions of the rolling stock and on how to handle malfunctions.

See also
List of Cairo metro stations

References

Works cited

Cairo Metro
Railway lines opened in 1987